Kwah (Kwa), also known as Baa (Bàː), is a Niger–Congo language of uncertain affiliation; the more it has been studied, the more divergent it appears. Joseph Greenberg counted it as one of the Bambukic languages of the Adamawa family. Boyd (1989) assigned it its own branch within Waja–Jen. Kleinewillinghöfer (1996) removed it from Waja–Jen as an independent branch of Adamawa. When Blench (2008) broke up Adamawa, Kwah became a provisional independent branch of his larger Savannas family.

Blench (2019) lists the locations of Baa as Gyakan and Kwa towns (located near Munga) in Numan LGA, Adamawa State, Nigeria. One Baa-speaking person (singular) is raBáà (sg.), and more than one would be Báà (pl.); the language is referred to by speakers as nyaa Báà. The Baa varieties in each of the two towns differ primarily in phonology.

Baa traditional religion has two main deities, Gbandima and Kassimin.

Further reading
Möller Nwadigo, Mirjam. 2016. A documentation project of Baa, a language of Nigeria. London: SOAS, Endangered Languages Archive.

References

External links
Baa (Kwa). Adamawa Languages Project.
Baa, by Mirjam Möller Nwadigo. AdaGram.
ELAR collection: A documentation project of Baa, a language of Nigeria deposited by Mirjam Möller Nwadigo

Languages of Nigeria
Adamawa languages